The 2017 Women's Basketball Invitational (WBI) is a single-elimination tournament of 16 National Collegiate Athletic Association (NCAA) Division I teams that did not participate in the 2017 NCAA Division I women's basketball tournament or 2017 Women's National Invitation Tournament. The 2017 field was announced on March 13. First round WBI games took place on March 15 and 16; second-round games were played March 18 and March 19. The tournament semifinals were held March 23 with the 2017 WBI Championship game played the final weekend of March. Rice won the WBI for the first time ever, beating UNC Greensboro, 74–62.

Bracket

WBI Championship Game

* - Denotes overtime period

References

Women's Basketball Invitational
Women's Basketball Invitational